Douglas Barr Scott (12 May 1920 – 12 March 2012) was a former Australian  National Party politician and briefly government minister.

Scott was born in Adelaide, South Australia and graduated from Scotch College, Adelaide and from the University of Sydney with a Bachelor of Arts. He was a farmer and grazier before entering politics. During World War II, he was a member of the Royal Australian Naval Volunteer Reserve from 1941 to 1945 and was discharged with the rank of lieutenant.

Scott was appointed by the Parliament of New South Wales on 6 August 1970 to the Australian Senate to fill a casual vacancy created by the death of Colin McKellar and held it until the 21 November 1970 half Senate election. He was elected to the Senate at the May 1974 election. In 1979, he was appointed Minister for Special Trade Representations in Malcolm Fraser's ministry, until August 1980, when he was replaced by Ian Sinclair, following Sinclair's acquittal on fraud charges. He did not stand for re-election at the 1984 election and retired at the expiration of his term at the end of June 1985.

He died in Forbes on 12 March 2012, aged 91.

Notes

1920 births
2012 deaths
National Party of Australia members of the Parliament of Australia
Members of the Australian Senate for New South Wales
Members of the Australian Senate
20th-century Australian politicians